is a town located in Nagano Prefecture, Japan. , the town had an estimated population of 9,793 in 3947 households, and a population density of 247 persons per km². Ikeda is listed as one of The Most Beautiful Villages in Japan.

Geography
Ikeda is located in north-central Nagano Prefecture.

Surrounding municipalities
Nagano Prefecture
 Ōmachi
 Azumino
 Matsukawa
 Ikusaka

Climate
The town has a climate characterized by hot and humid summers, and cold winters (Köppen climate classification Cfa).  The average annual temperature in Ikeda is 10.9 °C. The average annual rainfall is 1185 mm with September as the wettest month. The temperatures are highest on average in August, at around 24.3 °C, and lowest in January, at around -1.7 °C.

Demographics
Per Japanese census data, the population of Ikeda has remained relatively steady over the past 50 years.

History
The area of present-day Ikeda was part of ancient Shinano Province. Ikeda developed as a post station on the Chikukhi kaidō, a highway connecting inland regions of Shinano with the Sea of Japan at Itoigawa. The village of Ikedamachi was created with the establishment of the modern municipalities system on April 1, 1889. It was elevated to town status on April 1, 1915 as Ikeda. Ikeda annexed the neighboring village of Aisome on November 1, 1955.

Education
Ikeda has two public elementary schools and one public middle school operated by the town government, and one public high school operated by the Nagano Prefectural Board of Education. The prefecture also operates a special education school.

Transportation

Railway
The town is not serviced by any passenger railway line

Highway
 The town is not on any national highway

References

External links

Official Website 

 
Towns in Nagano Prefecture